East Point is a census-designated place and unincorporated community in Cullman County, Alabama, United States. Its population was 172 as of the 2020 census.

Demographics

References

Census-designated places in Cullman County, Alabama
Census-designated places in Alabama
Unincorporated communities in Cullman County, Alabama
Unincorporated communities in Alabama